Curtis Brandt Smith Jr. (born 18 April 1959) is an American politician and academic serving as a member of the Arkansas House of Representatives from the 58th district. In 2022, he was a candidate for U.S. congress in Arkansas's 1st congressional district.

Early life and education 
Smith was born in Albuquerque, New Mexico. The son of a pastor, his family moved frequently before settling in Jonesboro, Arkansas. He received a Bachelor of Arts degree from the National Louis University in 1990, a Master of Arts in religious education from Mid-America Baptist Theological Seminary in 1997, and a Ph.D. in management leadership from Capella University in 2011.

Career 
From 1992 to 2011, Smith worked as a missionary for International Mission Board. From 2006 to 2008, Smith also worked for Millennium Relief and Development Services, a non-profit organization. Smith has also been an adjunct professor at American Military University and Liberty University. Smith was elected to the Arkansas House of Representatives in November 2014 and assumed office in January 2015. In the 2021–2022 legislative session, Smith has served as vice chair of the House Judiciary Committee.

Smith was defeated by Crawford by a wide margin in the district's Republican Primary.

References

1959 births
Living people
Politicians from Albuquerque, New Mexico
Politicians from Jonesboro, Arkansas
National Louis University alumni
Mid-America Baptist Theological Seminary alumni
Capella University alumni
United States Army officers
Liberty University faculty
Southern Baptists
Baptist missionaries from the United States
Republican Party members of the Arkansas House of Representatives
21st-century American politicians
Baptists from Arkansas
Candidates in the 2022 United States House of Representatives elections